Hinea punctostriata is a species of sea snail, a marine gastropod mollusk in the family Planaxidae.

Description

Distribution
This species occurs in the European part of the Atlantic Ocean, the Mediterranean Sea and the Red Sea.

References

 Gofas, S.; Le Renard, J.; Bouchet, P. (2001). Mollusca, in: Costello, M.J. et al. (Ed.) (2001). European register of marine species: a check-list of the marine species in Europe and a bibliography of guides to their identification. Collection Patrimoines Naturels, 50: pp. 180–213
 Streftaris, N.; Zenetos, A.; Papathanassiou, E. (2005). Globalisation in marine ecosystems: the story of non-indigenous marine species across European seas. Oceanogr. Mar. Biol. Annu. Rev. 43: 419–453

External links
 Smith, E. A. (1872). Remarks on several species of Bullidae, with descriptions of some hitherto undescribed forms and of a new species of Planaxis. Annals and Magazine of Natural History. ser. 4, 9: 344-355.
 Dekker, H.; Orlin, Z. (2000). Check-list of Red Sea Mollusca. Spirula. 47 (supplement): 1-46

Planaxidae
Molluscs of the Atlantic Ocean
Molluscs of the Mediterranean Sea
Fauna of the Red Sea
Gastropods described in 1872